"Never Gonna Rain" is a song recorded by Bryan Adams. It was first released on January 25, 2022 is the fourth single from the album So Happy It Hurts.

Background
The song has a strong melodic rock connotation and speaks of optimism. “Never Gonna Rain” premiered on the Steve Wright show Steve Wright in the Afternoon on BBC Radio 2, and was accompanied by a very intimate video clip.

Adams said, "The ultimate optimist is someone who keeps on expecting the best, even in the face of the worst. Living in the moment, instead of in fear. Turning the negatives into positives. Taking the rain and turning it into a gift."

Music video
The video for the single was directed Adams, and was filmed in November 2021 in the loading bay of the Wynn Las Vegas, with guitarist Keith Scott on guitar and drummer Pat Steward. The video of the song was published on Adams' official Youtube channel.

Credits and personnel

Song 
 Bryan Adams —  lead and background  vocals, hammond  organ, bass, electric  guitar, producer, songwriter, composer, drums
 Mike Elizondo — background  vocals, songwriter, composer
 Jason Evigan — background  vocals, songwriter, composer
 Kennedi Lykken — background  vocals, songwriter, composer
 Gretchen Peters — songwriter, composer
 Amy Wadge — background  vocals
 Pat Steward — drums
 Hayden Watson — sound  engineer
 Olle Romo — sound  engineer
 Emily Lazar — sound  engineer
 Chris Allgood — sound  engineer

Video 
 Bryan Adams — director
 Angela Barkan — BMG
 Bill Fishman — producer
 Antonio Herrera-Vaillant — editor
 Hayden Watson — sound
 Aidan Farrel — colour grading
 Barney Jordan — editor

References

2022 singles
2022 songs
Bryan Adams songs
Songs written by Bryan Adams
BMG Rights Management singles
Songs written by Gretchen Peters
Songs written by Mike Elizondo
Songs written by Jason Evigan
Songs written by Kennedi Lykken